The enzyme sugar-terminal-phosphatase (EC 3.1.3.58) catalyzes the chemical reaction

D-glucose 6-phosphate + H2O  D-glucose + phosphate

This enzyme belongs to the family of hydrolases, specifically those acting on phosphoric monoester bonds.  The systematic name is sugar-ω-phosphate phosphohydrolase. This enzyme is also called xylitol-5-phosphatase.

References

 

EC 3.1.3
Enzymes of unknown structure